Dick Rathmann (born James Rathmann; January 6, 1924February 1, 2000) was an American race car driver.

He drove in the AAA Championship Car series in the 1949 and 1950 seasons with 4 starts, including the 1950 Indianapolis 500.  He finished in the top ten once, in 6th position at Milwaukee in 1950.

In 1951, he moved to NASCAR, where he was a very successful Grand National driver through 1955.

In 1956, he returned to the USAC Championship Car series, racing in the 1956–1964 seasons with an additional 41 starts, including the Indianapolis 500 races in 1956 and 1958–1964.  He finished in the top ten 21 more times, with his best finish in 2nd position in 1959 at Daytona.

Rathmann sat on the pole for the 1958 Indianapolis 500. On the first lap, he and fellow front-row starter Ed Elisian raced into turn 3 and started a chain-reaction accident which involved 15 cars and claimed the life of Pat O'Connor. With that accident, Rathmann became the first Indy pole-sitter to complete no laps. This feat has been repeated only twice in Indy history, first by Roberto Guerrero and then by Scott Sharp.

Rathmann was the elder brother of 1960 Indianapolis 500 winner Jim Rathmann. The two switched names in 1946 so his younger brother could enter a race while underage.  For what was supposed to be a short time, he adopted the name "Dick" and his brother adopted the name "Jim".  The change stuck for life.

In 2009, Rathmann was inducted into the West Coast Stock Car Hall of Fame.

World Championship career summary
The Indianapolis 500 was part of the FIA World Championship from 1950 through 1960. Drivers competing at Indy during those years were credited with World Championship points and participation. Dick Rathmann participated in 5 World Championship races. He started on the pole once and accumulated a total of 2 World Championship points.

Racing record

American open-wheel racing
(key) (Races in bold indicate pole position)

USAC Championship Car

Indianapolis 500

Rathmann qualified for the 1957 race, but was mugged the night before the event. He was replaced in the car by Johnnie Parsons.

NASCAR
(key) (Bold – Pole position awarded by qualifying time. Italics – Pole position earned by points standings or practice time. * – Most laps led. ** – All laps led.)

Grand National Series

Pacific Coast Late Model Division

Complete Formula One World Championship results
(key) (Races in bold indicate pole position; races in italics indicate fastest lap)

References

External links

1924 births
2000 deaths
Indianapolis 500 drivers
Indianapolis 500 polesitters
NASCAR drivers
Racing drivers from Los Angeles